Marcus J. Molinaro (born October 8, 1975) is an American politician serving as the U.S. representative for New York's 19th congressional district since 2023. A member of the Republican Party, Molinaro was a member of the Dutchess County Legislature and the New York State Assembly before being elected county executive of Dutchess County, New York in 2011. He was reelected county executive in 2015 and 2019. Molinaro is also a former mayor of Tivoli; when he became mayor at age 19, he was the youngest mayor in the United States.

Molinaro was the Republican nominee for governor of New York in 2018, losing to Democratic incumbent Andrew Cuomo.

On September 21, 2021, Molinaro announced that he would run for New York's 19th district in the United States House of Representatives in 2022. In the special election held on August 23, 2022, Molinaro lost to Democratic nominee Pat Ryan, the Ulster County executive, 51.2% to 48.8%. Molinaro was the Republican nominee for the same seat in the November 2022 general election, this time defeating Democratic nominee Josh Riley under new district lines. Ryan, who defeated Molinaro in August, was also elected to a full term simultaneously in a neighboring district.

Early life
Molinaro was born in Yonkers, New York, to Anthony Molinaro and Dona Vananden. After his parents' divorce, he and his mother moved to Beacon, New York, in 1980, and to Tivoli, New York, in 1989. Molinaro's mother struggled financially, and the family received food stamps. Molinaro graduated from Dutchess Community College with an Associate of Science degree in Humanities and Social Sciences.

Early political career
Molinaro was first elected to public office at the age of 18 in 1994, when he was elected to the Village of Tivoli's Board of Trustees. In 1995, he became the youngest mayor in the U.S. when he was elected mayor of Tivoli. He was reelected five times, and also served in the Dutchess County Legislature.

New York State Assembly
In 2006, Molinaro was elected to represent the 103rd District in the New York State Assembly. He served in the Assembly until 2011. In January 2011, at the recommendation of Assembly Minority Leader Brian Kolb, Governor Andrew Cuomo appointed Molinaro to serve on the Governor's Mandate Relief Redesign Team.

Dutchess County Executive
Molinaro announced his bid to succeed 20-year Dutchess County Executive William Steinhaus in May 2011. The campaign was endorsed by the county's Republican, Conservative, and Independence parties. On June 3, Beekman supervisor Dan French won the Democratic nomination. Molinaro won the November 8, 2011, election with 62% of the vote. He was sworn into office on January 1, 2012. In 2015, Molinaro was reelected, defeating Democratic nominee Diane Jablonski, 30,181 votes to 17,539. Molinaro won a third term in 2019, defeating Democratic nominee Joseph Ruggiero, 41,285 votes to 29,293.

In 2014, Molinaro was awarded the Pace University Land Use Law Center's Groundbreaker's Award. As county executive, he spearheaded a 2015 initiative called "Think Differently" for people with disabilities; he also appointed a Deputy Commissioner of Special Needs in 2016. In 2015, Molinaro was elected second vice president of the New York State Association of Counties.

2018 gubernatorial election

In March 2018, Molinaro informed Republican leaders that he would run for governor of New York in the 2018 election. He announced his candidacy on April 2, 2018, and was endorsed by the New York Conservative Party on April 13. On May 23, the Republican Party unanimously nominated Molinaro for governor at its state convention, three days after the Reform Party endorsed Molinaro for its gubernatorial ticket. Molinaro's running mate was Julie Killian, a former Rye City councilwoman and State Senate candidate. While he was described as a moderate during the campaign, Molinaro said in a March 2018 interview that he considered himself a communitarian, explaining that he believed leaders need to bring together community members of different perspectives to solve the problems they face.

Molinaro lost to incumbent Governor Andrew Cuomo in the 2018 election, garnering 36% of the vote.

U.S. House of Representatives

Elections

2022 special 

On September 21, 2021, Molinaro announced his candidacy for Congress in New York's 19th congressional district. Ten days after this announcement, his campaign reported that it had raised at least $350,000. A special election to fill the 19th congressional district seat was held in August 2022. The seat was left vacant following Antonio Delgado's appointment as Lieutenant Governor of New York. Molinaro lost the special election to Democrat Pat Ryan.

2022 general 

Molinaro was also the Republican nominee in the November 2022 general election in the 19th district. In that election, he faced Democratic nominee Josh Riley. Molinaro campaigned as a moderate, committing to protect full access to abortion in New York and LGBTQ+ rights. He narrowly won the House seat with 49.9% of the vote.

Caucus memberships 

 Republican Main Street Partnership

Personal life
Molinaro and his wife, Corinne Adams, reside in Red Hook, New York. Molinaro had two children with his first wife and he has two children with Adams. His daughter Abigail is on the autism spectrum.

Molinaro is Protestant.

Electoral history

References

External links
 Congressman Marc Molinaro official U.S. House website
Marc Molinaro for Congress

|-

|-

|-

|-

1975 births
21st-century American politicians
American Protestants
Candidates in the 2018 United States elections
Candidates in the 2022 United States House of Representatives elections
Christians from New York (state)
County executives in New York (state)
Dutchess Community College alumni
Living people
Mayors of places in New York (state)
Republican Party members of the New York State Assembly
Republican Party members of the United States House of Representatives from New York (state)
People from Red Hook, New York
People from Beacon, New York
People from Yonkers, New York
Politicians from Dutchess County, New York
Protestants from New York (state)